Wolfgang Feneberg (1935 – 8 March 2018) was a German Roman Catholic, later an Evangelical Lutheran theologian of the New Testament, ex-Jesuit and Parson of the Evangelical Lutheran Church in Bavaria and Professor. Feneberg was the founder of the "Bibelschule in Israel".

Life

Education 
After studying a philosophy and  Catholic theology, Feneberg continued a doctorate in New Testament theology. He completed the Pedagogy degree Magister (Mag. Ped.).

Teaching 
In 1977 Feneberg started as teacher of "Introduction and Exeges of the New Testament" in the Munich School of Philosophy, and worked after leaving the Jesuit order as a pastor in volunteering in the
Evangelical Lutheran Church in Bavaria, continue in Bible Schools in the University of Erlangen-Nuremberg, the German University in Armenia (Professor of New Testament and Jewish Studies), and as Vice President and Speaker of the Academy of St. Paul.

Academic work 
He has published on various themes of the New Testament theology and Ignatian Spirituality, and was active in retreat accompanied and spiritual direction.

Selected works

Books

Magazine and encyclopedia articles

References

1935 births
2018 deaths
20th-century German Jesuits
New Testament scholars
20th-century German Protestant theologians